The Man in Grey is a 1943 British film melodrama made by Gainsborough Pictures; it is considered to be the first of a series of period costume dramas now known as the "Gainsborough melodramas".  It was directed by Leslie Arliss and produced by Edward Black from a screenplay by Arliss and Margaret Kennedy that was adapted by Doreen Montgomery from the 1941 novel The Man in Grey by Eleanor Smith. The film's sets were designed by Walter Murton.

The picture stars Margaret Lockwood, Phyllis Calvert, James Mason, Stewart Granger and Martita Hunt. It melds elements of the successful "women's pictures" of the time with distinctive new elements.

Plot
In London, in 1943, a Wren (Phyllis Calvert) and an RAF pilot (Stewart Granger) meet at an auction of the Rohan estate, now being sold off because the last male heir died at Dunkirk. The gems of the auction are two portraits, one of the 8th Marquis of Rohan, known as The Man in Grey, and one of his wife, Clarissa, a famous Regency beauty, with their son. Trying to make conversation with the Wren, the pilot wonders what the Rohans did to deserve all this wealth, then shows her a ring with the family crest. He bids on a Georgian trinket box that belonged to Clarissa, Marquess of Rohan, a gift for his mother, who believes that an ancestor received the ring from his beloved Clarissa. The auction pauses; they agree to return the next day. He is Peter Rokeby. The auctioneer addresses her as Lady Clarissa Rohan, the last of the line. They look over the contents of the box: a fan, a snuff box, a sewing kit, a wooden toy, and a prospectus for Miss Patchett's Establishment for young ladies in Bath. As they leave, the camera zooms in on the paper, then dissolves to a snowman and a bevy of elegant young ladies of long ago—throwing snowballs.

Hesther Shaw (Margaret Lockwood) arrives, in mourning. As a kindness to Hesther's impoverished stepmother, Miss Patchett will prepare her to be a teacher. Hesther is proud and bitter. She resents charity and even kindness. The naive and much-loved Clarissa (Phyllis Calvert) insists on being friends. A fortuneteller tells Clarissa of a prosperous future beside a man in grey, but says that love will come from across the sea. She warns her not to trust women and refuses to say what she sees in Hesther's hand.

Months later, Hesther runs away with a penniless ensign. Miss Patchett forbids mention of her name, and Clarissa, out of loyalty to her friend, leaves the school.

In London, Clarissa's godmother arranges for her to meet the “man in grey” (after his grey clothes), the wealthy Marquess of Rohan (James Mason), a notorious rake, misanthrope and duelist. He marries her to get an heir, and they live separate lives.

One night, Clarissa rushes to a production of Othello in St Albans, rightly believing that Hesther is playing Desdemona. Her coach is waylaid by a mysterious man (Stewart Granger) who needs a ride. He turns out to be Rokeby, the actor playing Othello. Clarissa invites Hesther to supper after the play and, moved by her sad story, promises to engage her as her son's governess. Lord Rohan invites Hesther to stay on as Clarissa's companion, instead.

Rohan tells Hesther that he knows that she abandoned her husband and left him to die in Fleet Prison. He admires her ruthless ambition, and they become lovers.

At the Epsom Downs races and fair, Clarissa and Rokeby meet again. He wins the bird toy. They see the fortuneteller, who recognizes Rokeby as Clarissa's future and warns her again about dangerous women.  

Hesther offers Rokeby a position as Rohan's librarian. Rokeby perceives Hesther's plotting, but eventually confesses his love to Clarissa. They plan to elope to Jamaica, where Rokeby will regain his plantation. Rohan confronts them in Vauxhall Gardens, and the ensuing duel is stopped by the Prince Regent. Mrs. Fitzherbert persuades Rokeby to embark alone and wait for Clarissa's friends to insist on a separation. Clarissa pursues him to the port to say farewell. She takes his snuffbox as a memento. She is supposed to take refuge with Lady Marr, but she falls ill and is taken to Rohan's London house. Hesther drugs Clarissa, opens the windows on a storm and damps the fire—ensuring her death.

Rohan agrees to marry Hesther, but Clarissa's faithful page boy, Toby, reveals all to Rohan. Though he did not love her, Clarissa was his wife and a Rohan—so he beats Hesther to death with a cane, again fulfilling the family motto, "Who Dishonours Us, Dies."

In 1943, Peter and Clarissa are too late to buy the box, but they do not care. Hand in hand, they run toward a London bus and the future.

Cast
 Margaret Lockwood ... Hesther
 Phyllis Calvert ... Clarissa (19th century, and present day)
 James Mason ... Lord Rohan
 Stewart Granger ... Rokeby (19th century, and present day)
 Antony Scott (as Harry Scott) ... Toby
 Martita Hunt ... Miss Patchett
 Helen Haye ... Lady Rohan
 Beatrice Varley ... Gipsy
 Raymond Lovell ... The Prince Regent
 Nora Swinburne ... Mrs. Fitzherbert

Production

Original novel
The novel was published in 1941. The New York Times thought it was old fashioned but enjoyed the depiction of the era saying it created a "lively scene for a sad story." The book was a best seller in the US, selling more than 100,000 copies in 1942.

Casting
Margaret Lockwood later wrote that when she heard about the project, she read the novel and thought she would be ideal for the role of Clarissa. She was not pleased to be cast as Hesther, writing in her memoirs, "true, I had played that unpleasant little piece in The Stars Look Down after many misgivings. But Hesther was a different matter. She was downright wicked." She says she was persuaded by Carol Reed's advice to not "bother about the number of pages in a part, but think about the motivation." Lockwood "didn't like the motivation - but it was a 'meaty' part."

Lockwood says that James Mason's role was originally offered to Eric Portman who turned it down. The climax was graphic for its time with Mason's brutal beating of Lockwood's cowering villainess using his walking stick.

Lockwood was the only one of the four leads to be a star when the film was made. She told a journalist at the time:
It is a part Hollywood would have given to a star like Bette Davis. I intend... to 'give it a go.' Its Regency settings are away from the war. It has plenty of emotional, dramatic quality, yet it calls for subtlety. It is a role I can handle well under English direction, for British studios don't concentrate on glamorising stars to such an extent that they become camera-conscious, thinking only of whether they are at the right angle to the camera.
Lockwood said the second male lead was not cast "right up to the day before shooting began... lots of young men had been tried out, all unsuccessfully." Stewart Granger was appearing in a production of Rebecca on stage when he was called in to audition. He says he had been recommended to the producers by Robert Donat, with whom Granger had just appeared on stage in To Dream Again. Granger was the last of the four leads cast and was paid £1,000 for 12 weeks work. "I'd have played the part for nothing", he later wrote in his memoirs. "It was such a chance."

Lockwood said "as I watched him walk nervously across the set I knew instinctively he [Granger] would get the part.. He was rather an extraordinary young man in those days. He had what seemed to be an enormous inferiority complex, which came out sometimes in a flow of bad language, and at other times in round abuse of everybody, because he hadn't done his piece as well as we wanted."

Shooting
The film was shot in Gainsborough Studios. Phyllis Calvert was pregnant during filming.

Phyllis Calvert later said Leslie Arliss was "not at all" responsible for the eventual success of the film:
He was a lazy director; he had got a wonderful job there and he just sat back... Ted Black was the one who would watch it, cut it, and know exactly what the audience would take. I don't say he wanted to do really good films, but he knew where the money was and he made all those escapist films during the war.
According to Calvert, one time Arliss was late for a scene between Calvert and Granger so they directed themselves, and "Arlissing about" became a "Gainsborough byword for slackness."

James Mason later described his performance as "atrocious".

Reception

Box office
The film was a massive hit in the UK, turning the four lead actors into stars. Phyllis Calvert later recalled it "had two West End premieres. It had one premiere, got terrible notices, went through the provinces and made so much money that it had to come back to London."

It was the seventh most popular movie at the British box office in 1943. According to Kinematograph Weekly it came after In Which We Serve, Casablanca, The Life and Death of Colonel Blimp, Hello Frisco Hello and The Black Swan

It was the tenth most seen movie of the year in Australia. The movie was also successful when released in France in 1945 and in Germany.

In 1946 readers of the Daily Mail voted it their second most favourite British film of 1939–45.

Screenonline wrote that it was "easy to see why" the film was so well received:
It caught the national mood quite brilliantly, by fusing elements of previously successful "women's pictures" such as Rebecca (US, d. Alfred Hitchcock, 1940), Gaslight (d. Thorold Dickinson, 1940) and of course Gone With The Wind (US, d. Victor Fleming, 1939) with a surprisingly distinctive formula of its own, blending authentic star appeal (James Mason, Margaret Lockwood, Phyllis Calvert, the then newcomer Stewart Granger) with a plot whose novelettish surface concealed an intricate labyrinth of contrasts and doublings: good against evil, obedience against rebellion, male against female and class against class. The ingredients of virtually all the subsequent Gainsborough melodramas can be clearly seen taking root here. 
The movie was one of several films from the Rank organisation released in the United States by Universal. It was not as popular in the United States.

Critical
The Monthly Film Bulletin called the film " an elaborately produced version of Lady Eleanor Smith's novel, which, while good entertainment, is not outstanding, except in so far as it shows a British studio's competence to make this type of lavish literary production which hitherto only Hollywood has been able to do with consistent success. Acting, settings, camerawork, and direction all reach the highest technical standards."

Filmink says "[I]t was all done with intensity, conviction and flair and completely worked on its own trashy, melodramatic level... Lockwood, a delightful ingenue in comedies and thrillers and competent actor in drama, turned out to be a superb villainess in melodrama, all flaring nostrils, heaving cleavage and intense stares."

References
Notes

Bibliography
 Jerry Vermilye The Great British Films, Citadel Press, 1978, pp69–71

External links
 
 
 
 The Man in Grey at BFI Screen Online
 The Man in Grey at Films de France
 The Man in Grey at Britmovie
 Review of film at Variety
 Review of film at Criterioncast
 Review of 2012 DVD release at New York Times

1943 films
1940s historical drama films
British black-and-white films
British historical drama films
Cultural depictions of George IV
Films based on British novels
Films based on romance novels
Films directed by Leslie Arliss
Films set in 1943
Films set in London
Films set in the 19th century
Gainsborough Pictures films
Melodrama films
1943 drama films
1940s English-language films
1940s British films